"If It Isn't Love" is a song by American R&B quintet New Edition, and the first single from their fifth studio album, Heart Break (1988). The song became the biggest hit from the aforementioned album, reaching the top ten of the US Billboard Hot 100, peaking at number seven becoming their first top 10 hit following the departure of Bobby Brown, and reached the second position on the Hot Black Singles chart. Its chart performance and well-received music video garnered the quintet their first, and to date, sole nomination for Best R&B Performance by a Duo or Group with Vocals at the 31st Grammy Awards in February 1989. The song and video is also notable for being the introduction of fellow R&B singer Johnny Gill as a new member of the R&B quintet.

Overview
Written and produced by Jimmy Jam & Terry Lewis, the song spoke of a man who left a troubling relationship because he didn't want to fall in love, only to find out that he was in fact in love with his former girlfriend but is still in a dilemma over it: if it isn't love/why do I feel this way/why does she stay on my mind? The song has a memorable breakdown similar to that of The Jackson 5, where lead singer Ralph Tresvant admits that he made a mistake and he realizes he does love her, though his resolve is crushed as his bandmates then retort: You love her, what?! Though he is optimistic that he will get her back.

Release and reaction
This song returned New Edition to the top ten of both the pop and R&B singles charts, peaking at number seven and two, respectively. They were held off from the top spot of the Hot Black Singles chart by the same person that was voted out of the group just two years prior, Bobby Brown with his #8 pop hit "Don't Be Cruel". The music video for the song showcased the group along with their manager, Brooke Payne, going over rehearsal for a concert which has the band gearing up to hit the stage.  The video ended with the group running towards the stage, and transitioned them into their next music video; a concert performance for the follow-up single, "You're Not My Kind of Girl."

Track listing
 If It Isn't Love (12" Club Mix) - (7:42)
 If It Isn't Love (Instrumental) - (5:10)
 If It Isn't Love (Low Key Mix) - (4:30)

Personnel
Ronnie DeVoe: background vocals
Ricky Bell: background vocals
Michael Bivins: background vocals
Ralph Tresvant: lead vocals & background vocals
Johnny Gill: background vocals.

Charts

Weekly charts

Year-end charts

Trivia
 In their December 2, 2019 Monday Night Football game, four Seattle Seahawks, led by David Moore  and including Jaron Brown, Tyler Lockett, and DK Metcalf  used the dance from the video  in their touchdown celebration. 
 Beyoncé's video for her single "Love on Top" was inspired by the music video for "If It Isn't Love"
 Brooke Payne appears as the group's choreographer in the video.
 Sampled on rap group Kidz In The Hall 2008 release song "Whattup Wit Me".
 Sampled by Trick Daddy on his song "Ain't a Thug" from his album Thug Matrimony: Married to the Streets.
 Sung by Romeo, Bullethead and their singing group for a talent show on an episode of The Steve Harvey Show.
 The song is featured in the Wii game The Hip Hop Dance Experience.
 Sampled by Sevyn Streeter on her song "Fallen" (featuring Ty Dolla $ign and Cam Wallace) from her debut studio album Girl Disrupted.
 Sampled by Wale on his song "The One Time In Houston" from his album The Album About Nothing.
 Sampled by Kehlani on her song "In My Feelings" from her debut studio album SweetSexySavage.

References

1988 singles
1988 songs
MCA Records singles
New Edition songs
New jack swing songs
Song recordings produced by Jimmy Jam and Terry Lewis
Songs written by Jimmy Jam and Terry Lewis